N'Zi or N'zi may refer to a number of places in Ivory Coast:

 Nzi River, also spelt N'zi
 N'Zi Region, a region of Lacs District
 N'Zi-N'Ziblékro, a village in M'Bahiakro Department, Iffou Region, Lacs District
 N'Zi-Comoé, a defunct region that became part of Lacs District in 2011